Le Landreau is a commune in the Loire-Atlantique department in western France.

Population

References

See also
Communes of the Loire-Atlantique department

Communes of Loire-Atlantique